The KJ-2000, NATO reporting name: Mainring is a Chinese Airborne early warning and control system comprising domestically designed electronics and radars installed on a modified Ilyushin Il-76 airframe.

Development

The KJ-2000 development program started after the cancellation of the A-50I deal with Israel and Russia in July 2000, due to strong U.S. pressure regarding the Israeli radar that was to be mounted. China then went on to develop a domestic AWACS and the first aircraft made its maiden flight in 2003.

Four KJ-2000 aircraft have been identified so far, but production of new aircraft will likely be delayed, dependent on the acquisition of Il-76 airframes. Currently, the Russian defense exporter Rosoboronexport has imposed a significant price hike on all future Il-76s delivered to China and India despite previous contracts. Both countries are currently in negotiation with Russia regarding this matter as of early 2008.

In March 2011, Russia/China negotiations reached a new agreement to move production of Il-76s to Chinese owned companies. In this way it is expected production can be run smoothly to supply China with new Il-76 airframes, while delivery of Soloviev D-30KP-2 engines is not affected by recent issues.

Due to unreliable external supplier sources, China has developed a backup known as the KJ-200 by installing a simplified system on board the Shaanxi Y-8. This aircraft has a similar configuration to that of the KJ-2000 and is characterized by the triple tail-fin configuration (one large and two small).

Design
The Chinese AWACS has a phased array radar (PAR) carried in a round radome. Unlike the US AWACS aircraft, which rotate their rotodomes to give a 360degree coverage, the radar antenna of the Chinese AWACS does not rotate. Instead, three PAR antenna modules are placed in a triangular configuration inside the round radome to provide a 360degree coverage. The multi-function, three-dimensional pulse-Doppler radar was developed by NII (Nanjing Electronic Technology Research Institute), and is designed to detect and track airborne and surface targets.

It operates in the frequency range of 1200–1400 MHz. The antenna system consists of three phased arrays, located in a  disc. In contrast, the Russian Beriev A-50 and American Boeing E-3 Sentry use a  disc. Each phased array has a 120-degree field of view. A-50I of India made by Israel adopted its design and entered service later than KJ-2000(service 2004) in 2009.

KJ-3000
A new variant with a fixed next-generation radar was reportedly spotted in 2013.

Operational history
The PLAAF's first AWACS regiment was established at a small and remote airfield in southern China, for security reasons, during late 2004. The commander appointed to the regiment was Zhang Guangjian (张广建), a pilot with over 6,000 hours of flight time on various aircraft including the Il-76. The base was re-built and re-equipped for handling the KJ-2000, the first of which reached the base in 2005. A mixed fleet of KJ-2000 and the smaller KJ-200 have been operated at the base.

In 2013 a 24-hour coverage drill was held using three KJ-2000s that covered NW China, the East China Sea, and the South China Sea.

Since Il-76s are supplied by Russia and as the numbers are limited, China is seeking to replace the Il-76 platform currently used by the KJ-2000 with the Y-20.

Operators
 People's Republic of China
 People's Liberation Army Air Force – 5 were estimated in service .

Specifications
Limited performance parameters of KJ-2000 have been published as follows:
 Max speed (km/hr): 850
 Max range (km): 5500
 Max endurance (hr): 12
 Take-off weight (t): 175
 Range against fighter sized targets (km): 470
 Range against ballistic missiles (km): 1200
 Max # of target that can be tracked simultaneously: 100

See also

References

External links
 SinoDefence.com article – KJ-2000 AWACS (Airborne Warning And Control System).
 AirForceWorld.com KJ2000 Photo Collection

AWACS aircraft
2000s Chinese military aircraft
Quadjets
Aircraft first flown in 2003
High-wing aircraft
T-tail aircraft